Maribondo is a municipality located in the Brazilian state of Alagoas. Its population is 13,193 (2020) and its area is 171 km².

References

Municipalities in Alagoas